Tenzin Lekphell is a military officer and founder of Druk Nyamrup Tshogpa who is serving as 3rd Secretary-General of the International Organization BIMSTEC. He was nominated for Secretary General by Government of Bhutan. He also served as National General Secretary of Druk Nyamrup Tshogpa.

References 

Living people
Druk Nyamrup Tshogpa politicians
Bhutanese military personnel
Year of birth missing (living people)